, professionally known as , was a Japanese female enka singer who had a series of popular hits in the late 1960s and continued charting late into her career. 

With her distinctive husky voice, she acquired the nickname "Queen of the Blues". She appeared 18 times on the annual Kōhaku Uta Gassen show. After her death, a memorial to Aoe was established in the Isezakichō shopping area in Yokohama.

Selected discography
, 1968, one million sold
 1969, 1.5 million sold

Kōhaku Uta Gassen Appearances

References

External links 
 Obituary
 

Enka singers
Japanese women jazz singers
1941 births
2000 deaths
Singers from Tokyo
20th-century Japanese women singers
20th-century Japanese singers